Canada: A People's History is a 17-episode, 32-hour documentary television series on the history of Canada. It first aired on CBC Television from October 2000 to November 2001. The production was an unusually large project for the national network, especially during budget cutbacks. The unexpected success of the series actually led to increased government funding for the CBC.  It was also an unusual collaboration with the French arm of the network, which traditionally had autonomous production. The full run of the episodes was produced in English and French. The series title in French was Le Canada: Une histoire populaire. In 2004, OMNI.1 and OMNI.2 began airing multicultural versions, in Chinese, Greek, Hindi, Italian, Polish, Portuguese, and Russian.

The producers intended to make this a dramatic history of the Canadian people; as much as possible, the story was told through the words of the people involved, from great leaders and explorers to everyday people of the land at the time. The documentary makes effective use of visuals, transitions, and dramatic music from or evocative of the eras being covered. In the first season, actors representing historical figures spoke their words, while later seasons used voiceovers over photographic images and film or, when available, original recordings of the subject.

In June 2017, CBC Television aired two new episodes.  Part one aired on June 15, 2017, with part two on June 22nd 2017.

Episodes
Source:

Series 1

Series 2

Series 3

Series 4

2017 Series

Production
The production team, christened the Canadian History Project and later renamed the CBC Documentary Unit, was headed by producer Mark Starowicz until CBC discontinued in-house documentary production in 2015. Following Canada: A People's History, the team developed and produced such CBC documentary series as The Canadian Experience, The Greatest Canadian, Hockey: A People's History and 2012's acclaimed series about Canada's aboriginal communities, 8th Fire.

Awards
In 2001, Season One of Canada: A People's History was awarded three Gemini Awards by the Academy of Canadian Cinema and Television:
 Best Documentary Series
 Best Sound in an Information or Documentary Series or Program
 Best Original Score

The series was also recognized by the Columbus International Film and Video Festival in 2001 with a CHRIS Award in Humanities category for Best Series as well as recognition for Best Episode and Best print press/marketing materials.

The extensive bilingual website created to support and enhance the series was recognized with two awards at the 2001 Baddeck International New Media Festival: one for Best Education / Information / Training Web Site and Best Technical Achievement.

Canada's History Society awarded the series and its executive producer Mark Starowicz its Governor General's History Award for Popular Media: Pierre Berton Award in 2001.

See also

Canada's Story
 Events of National Historic Significance
 Heritage Minutes
 Hinterland Who's Who
 National Historic Sites of Canada
 Persons of National Historic Significance
 The Greatest Canadian

References

Further reading

External links
Official website

Canada: A People's History - CBC Archives

CBC Television original films
Studies of Canadian history
Canadian documentary television films
2000 Canadian television series debuts
Television series about the history of Canada
2000s Canadian documentary television series
Canadian historical television series